Houghton is a low-population, linear settlement with a large elevated tract of land which is mostly wooded and two main farms forming its civil parish in the Arun District of West Sussex, England. It is on the River Arun, where it has a bridge to a rural part of Amberley, 3 miles (5 km) north of Arundel.  The area is, equally, part of the South Downs National Park. The census 2011 included the population of South Stoke.

Geography
The Downs rise steeply from the riverside plain to the west and north-west of the developed street.  A straight side-road leads just  to the nearest village with a convenience shop, Bury, still on the relatively flat eastern plain, at the foot of the hills.  Homes are modest but many are listed buildings.

Amenities and recreation
In the village is a simple two-cell church dedicated to St Nicholas, originally built in the 13th century but largely rebuilt in 1857.  It is mid ranked in the national grading system of listed buildings (at Grade II*).

Houghton is home to the George and Dragon pub, pre-dating the English Civil War and said to have been a stop-off point of Charles I's son (the future Charles II) on his escape to France in 1651 following his defeat by Cromwell's army at the Battle of Worcester.  A large minority of Arundel Park where it is well-wooded is in the parish, as is Houghton Forest which is free public access and covers the west of the parish.

The Monarch's Way long-distance footpath (which follows Charles's supposed route from Worcester to Shoreham-by-Sea) descends from the Downs to the west into the village, before heading south along the river towards Arundel.

References

External links

St Nicholas Church

Arun District
Villages in West Sussex